Bulok may refer to:
Bulok, Gambia
Bulok, Tajikistan